Rinaldo Cuneo (July 2, 1877 – December 27, 1939), was an American artist known for his landscape paintings and murals. He was dubbed "the Painter of San Francisco".

Early life and education
Rinaldo Cuneo was born in San Francisco on July 2, 1877, part of an Italian American family of artists and musicians. Rinaldo was the second of Giovanni (John) Cuneo and his wife Annie's seven children. Rinaldo and his brothers Cyrus (1879–1916) and Egisto (1890–1972) all became artists. Their sisters Erminia, Clorinda, Evelina, and Clelia were interested in music and opera. The family lived on Telegraph Hill in San Francisco's Italian American neighborhood of North Beach. As an adult, Rinaldo's home and studio, on a cliff with unobstructed views of the bay, was just a block from his childhood home.

Cuneo enlisted in the Navy at age twenty, during the Spanish–American War, and served for three years aboard the Oregon as a gunner. He then worked at the family business, a steamship ticket agency, and began his art studies, taking night classes at the Mark Hopkins Institute of Art under Arthur Frank Mathews, Arthur Putnam, and Gottardo Piazzoni. Among his classmates were Ralph Stackpole and Maynard Dixon. His art education continued in London, and at Académie Colarossi in Paris (1911–1913). He studied under James Abbott McNeill Whistler.

Art

Perhaps best known for his oil paintings depicting landscapes of the San Francisco Bay Area and for his murals, Cuneo also painted cityscapes, marine scenes, and still lifes. His first exhibition, in 1913, was in San Francisco at the Helgesen Gallery, and his work was also shown at the 1915 Panama–Pacific International Exposition and in virtually every subsequent major Bay Area art exhibit until his death. A reviewer wrote that Cuneo's paintings "leave a mellow glow in one's heart. They portray not merely places, but mood and atmosphere."

His early color palette reflected that of Tonalism, with earthy, dark, neutral hues. One of his teachers, Whistler, was a leading Tonalist. Cuneo later adopted the lighter pastel palette associated with the Impressionists. Still later in his career, he used a palette which "vibrated with low-keyed, intense colors and radiance." His painting style also evolved throughout his career, and he integrated innovations which he came across into his own style, including aspects of Tonalism, Impressionism, and Modernism.

From 1916 to 1917 Cuneo worked for a tugboat service while living in San Anselmo, painting maritime scenes in his spare time. He taught at the California School of Fine Arts during the summer sessions of 1920, 1925, 1935, and 1936.

For his many exceptional paintings of the Bay Area, Cuneo was known as The Painter of San Francisco. Arthur Millier of the Los Angeles Times wrote that Cuneo's landscapes "breathe the essential strength and poetry of his region." Another critic noted that "they are the very soul and essence of California materialized in line and color." In addition to his California landscapes, in 1928 he also painted scenes of the Arizona desert. Cuneo said that "a landscape should embrace volume, simplicity, unity, a good sense of color values, rhythm of line, and above all, light."

In 1934 Cuneo received a commission from the Public Works of Art Project to paint two lunette murals of Bay Area Hills in the foyer of Coit Tower. A number of Cuneo's paintings were featured in the 1935 inaugural exhibition of the San Francisco Museum of Art. One of them, California Hills, was honored with the Museum's Purchase Prize award.

After a brief illness, Cuneo died in San Francisco on December 27, 1939.

Although he had been a popular artist with many well-received exhibits throughout his life, Cuneo had found himself unable to successfully market his paintings due to the economic conditions created by the Great Depression. This led to feelings that he had failed. San Francisco Chronicle columnist Herb Caen wrote that the artist's wife found "more than one hundred hitherto unseen Cuneo paintings, hidden in his two studios – in corners, in trunks, under books (some even hanging turned to the wall by the artist)." Many of these paintings were subsequently displayed in solo exhibitions, in 1940 at the San Francisco Museum of Art, in 1949 at the de Young Museum, and in 1961 at San Francisco's Gallery of Fine Arts.

A critic wrote in 1991 that Cuneo "was a Cezannesque purist worth remembering".

Exhibitions and collections
Cuneo's numerous solo exhibitions included ones in London, Paris, Rome, New York, and Los Angeles. His work was featured in exhibits at the Helgesen Gallery (San Francisco) (1913), Metropolitan Museum of Art (1933), Museum of Modern Art (New York), San Francisco Art Association (1916–34), Golden Gate International Exposition (1939), California Palace of the Legion of Honor, and the de Young Museum.

A 2009 exhibit at Museo ItaloAmericano, Cuneo: A Family of Early California Artists, presented a retrospective of the work of Rinaldo, Cyrus and Egisto Cuneo. It was the first exhibit to display the work of the three brothers together.

His work is also in many museum collections, including Oakland Museum of California, San Francisco Museum of Modern Art, Sierra Nevada Museum (Reno), de Young Museum, Laguna Art Museum, Los Angeles County Museum of Art, The Huntington, and Museo ItaloAmericano.

Gallery

Works

Selected paintings 
 1913 – Belle View, France, c.1913, oil on canvas
 1916 – Near San Anselmo, c. 1916
 1920 – Urban Park, c. 1920, oil on canvas, Museo ItaloAmericano,  San Francisco, California
 1920 – Three Panel Decorative Screen: Lake, Hills, Trees and Nude, c. 1920
 1927 – The Embarcadero at Night, c. 1927–1928, oil on plywood, Los Angeles County Museum of Art,  Los Angeles, California
 1927 – San Francisco from Telegraph Hill, c. 1927, oil on paper, Shasta State Historic Park, Shasta County, California
 1927 – Site of Aquatic Park, San Francisco, c. 1927, oil on paper, Shasta State Historic Park, Shasta County, California
 1928 – Old Fisherman's Warf, Monterey, oil on canvas, Shasta State Historic Park, Shasta County, California
 1928 – Untitled (Baker Beach, near San Francisco), c. 1928, Laguna Art Museum, Laguna Beach, California
 1930 – California Hills With White Boat, oil on canvas, Museo ItaloAmericano,  San Francisco, California
 1930s – Larkspur Landing Trestle c. 1930, 12 x 13, oil on board
 1930 – Storm Mountains, c. 1930, oil on canvas
 1930 – The Farm, c. 1930, oil on canvas
 1935 – Northern California, c. 1935, Huntington Library, near Pasadena, California
 1937 – Town and Hills, Utah, c. 1937, oil on canvas
 California Hills
 Cityscape
 San Anselmo, oil on canvas
 Self Portrait, oil on canvas board
 Still Life with Dahlias
 Untitled (Piedmont Hills), oil on canvas, Farhat Art Museum,  Beirut, Lebanon

Murals 
 1934 – Bay Area Hills, Coit Tower,  San Francisco, California

Notes

References

External links

 
 Cuneo: A Family of Early California Artists, 2009, Museo ItaloAmericano,  San Francisco, California
 The Cuneo Society Website

19th-century American painters
American male painters
20th-century American painters
American muralists
Painters from California
San Francisco Art Institute alumni
American people of Italian descent
1877 births
1939 deaths
Public Works of Art Project artists
Académie Colarossi alumni
People from San Anselmo, California
19th-century American male artists
20th-century American male artists